Phil Brown may refer to:

Phil Brown (actor) (1916–2006), American stage, film, and TV actor
Phil Brown (basketball coach), Australian basketball coach
Phil Brown (footballer, born 1959), English football manager and former player
Phil Brown (footballer, born 1966), English player-manager with Matlock Town
Phil Brown (skier) (born 1991), Canadian slalom skier
Phil Brown (sprinter) (born 1962), British runner, Olympic Games medalist
Phil Brown (American football) (1901–1991), American college football and basketball coach

See also
Philip Brown (disambiguation)